Hong Kong FA Cup Junior Division is a football competition in Hong Kong established in 2013. All lower division teams in the First Division, Second Division and the Third Division are included in the competition.

Sun Hei is the most successful club, winning 2 titles.

History
FA Cup Preliminary Round was founded by the Hong Kong Football Association in 2013, replacing the abolished Hong Kong Junior Challenge Shield. Between 2013 and 2016, the competition is designed to allow lower division clubs to qualify for the tournament proper. In 2016, after the HKFA decided not to allow lower division clubs to compete in the tournament proper anymore, it was then renamed to FA Cup Junior Division.

Champions

See also
 Hong Kong FA Cup
 Hong Kong Junior Challenge Shield

References

Hong Kong FA Cup
Hong Kong FA Cup Junior Division
Hong Kong First Division League
Hong Kong Second Division League
Hong Kong Third Division League
Hong Kong Fourth Division League